The European Journal of Obstetrics & Gynecology and Reproductive Biology is a monthly peer-reviewed medical journal covering obstetrics and gynecology and reproductive biology. It was originally established as Nederlandsch Tijdschrift voor Verloskunde en Gynaecologie in 1889, briefly renaming itself European Journal of Obstetrics and Gynecology in 1971, and acquiring its current name in 1972. and is published by Elsevier. The editor-in-chief is Janesh K. Gupta (University of Birmingham). According to the Journal Citation Reports, the journal has a 2017 impact factor of 1.809.

References

External links

Biology in Europe
Obstetrics and gynaecology journals
Reproductive health journals
Elsevier academic journals
Publications established in 1889
Monthly journals
English-language journals